The Riverside Boat Club is a private, non-profit, rowing club on the Charles River in Cambridge, Massachusetts, United States of America.  Founded in 1869 by workers from the Riverside Press.

Prominent members
Lauren Schmetterling - 2016 US Olympic Team member (Women's Open Eight)
Alex Rothmeier - 2009 US National Team member (Lightweight Men's Pair)
Hillary Saeger - 2009 US National Team member (Lightweight Women's Quadruple Sculls)
Stefanie Sydlik - 2009 US National Team member (Lightweight Women's Quadruple Sculls)
John Wainwright - 2009 US National Team member (Lightweight Men's Pair)
Liane Malcos - 2008 US Olympic Team member (Alternate)
Will Daly	- 2007 US National Team member (Men's Lightweight Eight)
Andrew Diebold - 2007 US National Team member (Men's Lightweight Eight)
Jeff Forrester - 2007 US National Team member (Men's Lightweight Eight)
Esther Lofgren - 2007 US National Team member (Spare)
John Nichols - 2007 US National Team member (Men's Lightweight Eight)
Tyler Resch - 2007 US National Team member (Men's Lightweight Eight)
Greg Ruckman - 2007 US National Team member (Men's Lightweight Eight)
Andrew Hashway - 2012 US National Team member (Men's Lightweight Eight)
Bruce Smith  - 2007 US National Team Coaching Staff
Kent Smack - 2001 US National Team member (Men's Double Sculls); 2004 USA Olympic Team

See also
List of Charles River boathouses

References

Rowing clubs in the United States
Organizations based in Cambridge, Massachusetts
Clubs and societies in Massachusetts
Sports clubs established in 1869
1869 establishments in Massachusetts